Ulyses Thurman Jr. (born September 8, 1964) is a former American and Canadian football defensive back in the National Football League (NFL) and Canadian Football League (CFL). He played for the New Orleans Saints of the NFL and the Calgary Stampeders and Birmingham Barracudas of the CFL. Thurman played college football at Southern California (USC). Thurman was selected as one of 75 greatest players in Calgary Stampeder franchise history(CFL) on August 31, 2021. He was a Western All-Star and Canadian All-Pro in both 1991 and 1992. He also helped the Stampeders win the Grey Cup Championship in 1992. Thurman was forced to retire after the 1995 season because of a knee injury. 

His brother, Dennis Thurman, played in the NFL and has served as the defensive coordinator for the New York Jets and Buffalo Bills.Dennis is currently the defensive coordinator at Jackson State University.

References

1964 births
Living people
Players of American football from Santa Monica, California
American players of Canadian football
American football defensive backs
Canadian football defensive backs
USC Trojans football players
New Orleans Saints players
Calgary Stampeders players
Birmingham Barracudas players
National Football League replacement players